Kodjo Amétépé (born 18 December 1986) is a Togolese footballer who plays as a midfielder for Maranatha FC and the Togo national football team.

References

1986 births
Living people
Togolese footballers
Togo international footballers
Sportspeople from Lomé
Association football midfielders
Maranatha FC players
CF Mounana players
2013 Africa Cup of Nations players
21st-century Togolese people